Văn Giang is a rural district of Hưng Yên province in the Red River Delta region of Vietnam. As of 2003 the district had a population of 96,493. The district covers an area of 72 km². The district capital lies at Văn Giang.

References

Districts of Hưng Yên province